The men's moguls at the 2017 Asian Winter Games was held on 26 February 2017 at Bankei Ski Area in Sapporo, Japan.

Schedule
All times are Japan Standard Time (UTC+09:00)

Results
Legend
DSQ — Disqualified

Qualification

Final 1

Final 2

References

External links
Results at FIS website

Men's moguls